Banu Hanzala ibn Malik is a historical Arab tribe that inhabited al-Yamama in the Arabian Peninsula. It is a branch of the larger Banu Tamim tribe.

Ancestry 
According to Arabic genealogical works, the Banu Hanzala tribe is recorded as descended from Hanzala ibn Malik ibn Zayd Manat ibn Tamim ibn Murr ibn 'Id ibn Amr ibn Ilyas ibn Mudar ibn Nizar ibn Ma'ad ibn Adnan. And Hanzala had eight sons: Malik, Yarbu', Rabi'a, 'Amr, Murra, Ghalib, Kalfa and Qays. 

The sub-clans of Banu Hanzala are:

 Banu Darim
 Banu Yarbu'
 Banu Tahiuh
 Barajim

History 
Banu Hanzala is mentioned by Yaqut  in the battle of Yawm Dhi Najab, one of the Ayyam al-Arab battles. The battle was fought between Banu Amir with the help of Kindite king Akil al-Murar against Banu Hanzala. The Banu Amir marched in great numbers, and the two sides clashed in a place called Najba. Banu Hanzala came out victorious. The Kindite king Akil al-Murar was killed in the battle while many important figures of Banu Amir have been taken captive.

Notable members 

 Ishaq ibn Rahwayh
Muhammad ibn Abd al-Wahhab
Al-Aqra' bin Habis
Yala ibn Umayya
Khazim ibn Khuzayma al-Tamimi
Al ash-Sheikh
House of Al Thani
Muhammad ibn al-Uthaymeen

See also 

 Pre-Islamic Arabia
 Tribes of Arabia
 Jahiliyyah

References 

Tribes of Arabia